Slovak Evangelical Lutheran Church of the Augsburg Confession in Kisač (Vojvodina, Serbia) (Slovak: Slovenský evanjelický a. v. cirkevný zbor v Kysáči) is a Protestant church that serves local ethnic Slovak community.

History of the church

Early in summer of the 1773, the first evangelist a.c. families settled in Kisač. They were bought by the Grof Andrej Hadík. In the same year, the first Slovak evangelist Juraj Vardžík from Piešťany stool came to Kisač. The founders of the congregation of the Slovak Evangelical Lutheran a.c. Church in Kisač originated from 10 counties and from 55 different villages. For the first 10 years, the Lutherans from Kisač baptized their little ones and married in the Catholic church in Futog.

When tolerance patent of Emperor Joseph II was issued, Bački Petrovac received the first priest, Andrej Stehlo, in August 1783. In 1785 Kisač's local administrator requested that settlement should have teacher, which was regulated on March 21, 1785.
In 1787, local inhabitants requested a priest and an independent church, which was also regulated on December 22, 1787. The first service was on March 16, 1788 on Palm Sunday.

In 1795, the construction of the temple of God was started. During the celebration of the establishment of the temple of God, the priest was František Jesenský and Superintendent was Michal Sinovc.

On November 1, 1797 the Church was a sacrificed.

In 1799, the church tower was completed.

In 1885, church bought the organ from Karol Veselý.

In 1860, the second school was built.

In 1865, church members decided that temple should be increased.

The work was finished in 1866 and on November 11, the temple was consecrated by senior Gabriel Belohorsky.

In 1868, the tower was renovated.

In 1878, the third church  school was built.

In 1889, the fourth school was built.

In 1895, church purchased men's tavern, which became the fifth school.

In 1904, the sixth school was built. The first teacher was Samuel Záborsky (1785–1789).

In 1972, the Church-house was built (on November 5). Dedication carries bishop Dr. Juraj Struhárik.

In the September 1998, the windows on the church were replaced.

In September 1999, the replacement of the church roof began.

On May 10, 2001, the repair of the church tower started.

Priests
For last 200 years following priests served in the Church:

Since 1997, the priest in the church is pastor Ondrej Marčok, together with his wife Darina Marčok.

References
 Slobodan Ćurčić, Broj stanovnika Vojvodine, Novi Sad, 1996.
 Slobodan Ćurčić, Naselja Bačke - geografske karakteristike, Novi Sad, 2007.
 Enciklopedija Novog Sada, sveska 11, Novi Sad, 1998.

Churches in Vojvodina
Churches in Novi Sad
Slovaks of Vojvodina